Ink A. Aleaga (born April 27, 1973) is a former gridiron football linebacker who played for the New Orleans Saints of the National Football League and the BC Lions of the Canadian Football League. He played college football for the Washington Huskies. He appeared in 26 games, starting six, for the Saints from 1997 to 1999. In 2002, Aleaga played in two games for the Lions and recorded nine tackles.

References 

1973 births
Living people
American football linebackers
Canadian football linebackers
Washington Huskies football players
New Orleans Saints players
BC Lions players
Players of American football from Honolulu
Players of Canadian football from Honolulu